Sparganothina xanthozodion is a species of moth of the family Tortricidae. It is found in Peru.

The wingspan is about 14 mm. The ground colour of the forewings is yellow, consisting of several blotches. The markings are brownish rust. The hindwings are brown, in the distal half mixed with rust.

Etymology
The species name refers to colouration of forewings and is derived from Greek xanthos (meaning yellow) and zodion (meaning a small animal).

References

Moths described in 2010
Sparganothini
Moths of South America
Taxa named by Józef Razowski